The Fujifilm FinePix S3000 is a 3.2 megapixel digital camera with a 6x optical zoom lens. The camera was introduced in 2003 as the replacement for the FinePix 3800.

References

External links
Fujifilm FinePix S3000 Specifications (archived)

S3000
Cameras introduced in 2003